The R356 is a Regional Route in South Africa that connects the R46 near Ceres with Loxton by way of Sutherland and Fraserburg.

The route's south-eastern origin is the R355 near that route's origin at the R46 in the Western Cape. It heads north-east for 110 kilometres, crossing into the Northern Cape, before it reaches a junction with the R354 from the south. The two roads run together for 50 kilometres, through the Verlatekloof and Rooikloof Passes over the Komsberg Range, to reach Sutherland. The R354 leaves Sutherland heading north-west, but the R356 heads north-east to Fraserburg. The route crosses the R353 here at a staggered junction. It continues north-east, to end near Loxton at the R381.

External links
 Routes Travel Info

References

Regional Routes in the Northern Cape
Regional Routes in the Western Cape